The 1921 Chicago Cardinals season was their second in the American Professional Football Association. Although a myth persists that the team billed itself as the "Racine Cardinals", by 1921, the press generally referred to the team as the "Chicago Cardinals" and references to Chris O'Brien's team with the Racine name were few. The team had no connection to Racine, Wisconsin and played at Normal Park on Chicago's Racine Avenue.  The Cardinals failed to improve on their previous output of 6–2–2, winning only three APFA games. They finished eighth in the league.

Schedule

 Games in italics are against non-NFL teams

Standings

1921 Chicago Cardinals Roster
Paddy Driscoll QB
 
Bob Koehler FB

Rube Marquardt

Lenny Sachs LE

Ralph Horween

Fred Gillies LT

Frank Rydzeski

Norm Barry

Red O'Connor

Bernie Halstrom

Pete Steger

Garland Buckeye

Ping Bodie

Willis Berennan

Arnie Horween

Charlie Knight

Leo Chappell

Harry Curran

Dick Egan

Earl Potteiger

Walter Voight

John Scanlon

Paul LaRoss

Clyde Zoia

References

Arizona Cardinals seasons
Chicago Cardinals
Chicago Cardinals